Yarden or similar can mean:

People
 Yarden Cohen (footballer, born 1991), Israeli footballer
 Yarden Cohen (footballer, born 1997), Israeli footballer
Yarden Gerbi (born 1989), Israeli world champion judoka and Olympic bronze medalist
Nurit Yarden (born 1959), Israeli art photographer

Places
Jordan (name), as a name, comes from Yarden, meaning "one who descends"
Jordan River,  a river in West Asia flowing to the Dead Sea
Mishmar HaYarden, Israeli moshav
Mishmar HaYarden (moshava), Israeli moshava destroyed during the 1948 Palestine war
Yardena, Israeli moshav
Yardna or yardena, used to refer to rivers in Mandaeism

Other
Yarden wine, label of Israeli Golan Heights Winery